Neoeme annulicornis is a species of beetle in the family Cerambycidae. It was described by Buquet in 1859.

References

Oemini
Beetles described in 1859